Tetrapharmacum, Latinized from the Greek τετραφάρμακος  tetrapharmakos (feminine; also τετραϕάρμακον tetrapharmakon) "the "fourfold drug", was an ancient Greek pharmaceutical compound, a mixture of wax, pine resin, pitch and animal fat, most often pork fat.

The word tetrapharmakos has been used metaphorically by 1st-century Epicureans to refer to the four Κύριαι Δόξαι ("chief doctrines") or remedies for healing the soul.

Apparently named after this unprepossessing concoction, tetrapharmacum (or ''tetrafarmacum)  was a complicated and expensive dish in Roman Imperial cuisine. 
It contained sow's udder, pheasant, wild boar and ham in pastry. The only surviving source of information on the tetrafarmacum is the Augustan History, which mentions it three times. All three mentions are credited to the now-lost biography of Hadrian by Marius Maximus. According to this source, the Caesar Lucius Aelius (died 138) invented the dish;  his senior colleague, the Emperor Hadrian, liked it; a later emperor, Alexander Severus, liked it too.

References

Sources
 Galen, On the properties of simples (vol. 12 p. 328 Kühn).
 Augustan History Hadrian 21, Aelius 5, Alexander Severus 30.

Further reading
 , pp. 324–325

Roman cuisine
Ancient Greek medicine